Files Creek is a stream in the U.S. state of West Virginia.

Files Creek's name derives from Robert Foyle, a pioneer settler.

See also
List of rivers of West Virginia

References

Rivers of Randolph County, West Virginia
Rivers of West Virginia